The Perfume of the Lady in Black (French: Le parfum de la dame en noir) is a 2005 French comedy mystery film directed by Bruno Podalydès and starring Denis Podalydès, Sabine Azéma and Zabou Breitman. It is inspired by the 1908 novel of the same title by Gaston Leroux featuring the detective Joseph Rouletabille. It is a sequel to the 2003 film The Mystery of the Yellow Room.

Cast

References

Bibliography 
 Alistair Fox, Michel Marie, Raphaëlle Moine & Hilary Radner. A Companion to Contemporary French Cinema. John Wiley & Sons, 2015.

External links 
 

2005 films
French mystery films
2000s mystery films
2000s French-language films
Films directed by Bruno Podalydès
Films based on French novels
Films based on works by Gaston Leroux
2000s French films